First National Center, formerly known as First National Bank Building, is a prominent mixed-use skyscraper in downtown Oklahoma City.  The art deco tower is 406 feet (136 m) tall at the roof, and is 446 feet (150 m) at its spire and contains 33 floors. The building was constructed in 1931 by the First National Bank and Trust Company of Oklahoma City and has  of office space. 
 
First National Center is currently the third tallest building in Oklahoma City, after the Devon Tower and Chase Tower, respectively. The tower is the sixth tallest building in the state of Oklahoma. The tower has a notable architectural resemblance to the Empire State Building in New York City.

The First National Center is connected to adjacent buildings in the downtown area via the Oklahoma City Underground series of tunnels and elevated walkways. In 2007, the building had a 40% occupancy rate. By 2016, the occupancy rate had dropped to less than 20%.

History
The owner of the building was the First National Bank Corporation for use by the First National Bank and Trust Company of Oklahoma City. The bank's president E.P. Johnson and stockholders S.M. Gloyd, W.T. Hales, H.R. Hudson, R.A. Vose, and H.M. Johnson comprised the building's ownership and underwrote the construction. The building was built by Manhattan Construction Company. The cost of the building was $5 million.

Work began in September 1930, with the demolition of several smaller buildings on the site. By January 1931, the site was clear, and construction on the tower began February 1 and was completed by November of the same year. The bank moved into the building on December 14, 1931. When it was completed, the 33-story skyscraper was declared to be the fourth tallest building west of the Mississippi River.

In September 1957, the 14-story First National Office Building was completed on the east side of the tower, and in October 1977 an adjoining 14-story L-shaped annex was added that went east to Broadway Avenue, bringing First National Center complex to its current state.

Among many businesses of early day Oklahoma City, the Beacon Club was once located at the top of the building.

The First National Bank Corporation ran into troubled times in the 1980s, and failed. However, due to Oklahoma's liberalization of interstate banking, First Interstate Bank of Los Angeles assumed the assets of First National upon its failure in 1985, and the opened under their new name the following day. At the time, First National's failure was the largest bank in the nation to have sought FDIC protection. First Interstate operated the bank until 1991, when they sold it off to Boatmen's Bancshares of St. Louis.

In May 1992, Boatmen's announced it would vacate the building and the banking lobby.  Boatmen's had acquired Leadership Bank, and chose to utilize their headquarters in Leadership Square to the immediate northwest of First National Center. Boatmen's was later acquired by NationsBank - now Bank of America - and retains the Leadership Square headquarters for their Oklahoma City operations. Since Boatmen's departure, no bank has utilized First National Center. The building was sold to a California buyer for $21 million, with plans of a major renovation of the property. The buyer was organized as two separate entities, First National I, LLC and First National II, LLC, both of which are part of the Milbank Real Estate Group, led by chief executive officer Aaron Yashouafar.  Renovations were begun, with plans to restore it to its 1930s glory.  The buyer, however, ran out of money and filed for bankruptcy in the U.S. Bankruptcy Court for the Western District of Oklahoma in October 2010.  Since filing for bankruptcy, restoration activities within the building have ceased, leaving the building in apparent disrepair due to the halfway completed construction projects.  The famous "Great Banking Hall" is today used for various social events, galas, balls, and proms.

In August 2015, state agencies that had leased space within the building announced emergency relocations due to deteriorating conditions, including non-functioning elevators and an imminent air conditioning cutoff due to unpaid bills. On September 3, 2015, U.S. Federal Judge Stephen P. Friot ordered that the building be placed in receivership and for air conditioning and elevator service be restored as soon as possible.

In January 2017, the sale was finalized to local developers Gary Brooks and Charlie Nicholas for $23 million with plans to restore for use as a hotel, apartments, and offices. Coury Hospitality will be managing the future use of the hotel and NE Property Management will be managing the apartments. The renovation will transform approximately 190,000 square feet of the 1932 First National Bank office tower into a hotel with 139 keys. The restoration will include repair to murals, decorative painted ceilings, stone columns, cast stone, metal finishes, vault doors and safes. The basement and ground floor will be a mixture of retail, restaurant and commercial spaces. The Great Banking Hall will be restored and will be utilized as a public lobby and event space. The naming for the hotel is planned to be 'The National' while the naming for the apartments will be 'The First Residences at First National'. Construction is estimated to take 3 years.

Architecture

First National Center was built with an Art Deco, Neoclassical style inside and out, featuring polished aluminum, granite, glass and several varieties of marble from around the world. Rising 446 feet above the sidewalk, the building was topped out with an aluminum aviation tower and a red beacon light above a polished aluminum notched roof line. The aviation tower originally housed a massive white rotating beacon that was visible for 75 miles. When radio navigation superseded visual navigation after WWII, the powerful white was replaced with a lower-power red warning light. The 32nd floor was a public observation deck.  One of First National's most distinctive features is its night lighting, where the upper-story setbacks are lit white. There have been times when the lighting has changed - after 9/11, the setbacks were lit in red, white and blue tiers - which is still done on July 4. For many years, a cross was created by lighting office windows during Christmas. This is no longer done due to the fact that later construction obscures the First National from many views, but it has been taken up by the SandRidge and Chase Towers.

The Weary & Alford Company of Chicago designed First National Center, as well as other bank buildings around the country. Manhattan Construction Co. built First National's tower, and F.H. Beaumont of Oklahoma City supervised the majority of the building's construction. Murals depicting Oklahoma's history in the four corners of the banking lobby were painted by Chicago artist Edgar Spier Cameron.

The building was listed on the National Register of Historic Places in 2018.

Tenants
Oklahoma Tourism & Recreation Department

Events
On June 22, 2006, the tower experienced an electrical fire in its basement and was evacuated for the workday. There were no long-term effects from the fire. A section of Robinson Avenue adjacent to the building was temporarily closed.

On November 5, 2017, a fire broke out on the 26th floor of the tower.

On December 9, 2017, a fire broke out on the 7th floor of the tower.

See also
List of tallest buildings in Oklahoma City
List of tallest buildings in Oklahoma

References

Art Deco architecture in Oklahoma
Art Deco skyscrapers
Buildings and structures completed in 1931
Buildings and structures in Oklahoma City
Skyscraper hotels in Oklahoma City
Residential skyscrapers in Oklahoma City
National Register of Historic Places in Oklahoma City
1931 establishments in Oklahoma